"This Old Town" is a song collaboration by English musicians Paul Weller (formerly of The Jam and The Style Council) and Graham Coxon (of Blur fame). The song was released as a download single on 2 July 2007, and a limited edition 7" on 30 July (see 2007 in British music). The song also features Zak Starkey (of The Who and Oasis fame) on drums. The single peaked at #39 in the UK Singles Chart.

It was recorded at Black Barn Studios, Ripley, Surrey being engineered by Charles Rees.

In some places the song and its B-sides have been advertised as a "triple A-side."

Track listing
 "This Old Town" (Graham Coxon, Paul Weller) - 4:13
 "Each New Morning" (Graham Coxon) - 4:10
 "Black River" (Paul Weller) - 3:50

This Old Town was previously recorded by Ocean Colour Scene as For Dancers Only, included in their album On the Leyline.

References

2007 singles
Graham Coxon songs
Songs written by Paul Weller
Songs written by Graham Coxon
2007 songs